Acarolella is a genus of tortrix moths belonging to the subfamily Tortricinae and the tribe Cochylini. It was described in 1983 by Józef Razowski and V. O. Becker.

Species
As of November 2019, the Online World Catalogue of the Tortricidae listed the following species:
Acarolella gentilis Razowski, 1994
Acarolella obnixa Razowski & Becker, 1983
Acarolella stereopis (Meyrick, 1931)

See also
List of Tortricidae genera

References

 , 2005: World Catalogue of Insects volume 5 Tortricidae.
 , 2011: Diagnoses and remarks on genera of Tortricidae, 2: Cochylini (Lepidoptera: Tortricidae). Shilap Revista de Lepidopterologia 39 (156): 397–414.
 , 1983: Brazilian Cochylidii (Lepidoptera: Tortricidae). Acta Zoologica Cracoviensia 26: 421–464 (443).

Cochylini
Tortricidae genera
Taxa named by Józef Razowski